Bains is a village in Shaheed Bhagat Singh Nagar district of Punjab State, India. The village is administrated by Sarpanch an elected representative of the village.

Demography 
As of 2011, Bains has a total number of 438 houses and population of 2064 of which 1058 include are males while 1006 are females according to the report published by Census India in 2011. The literacy rate of Bains is 75.81%, lower than the state average of 75.84%. The population of children under the age of 6 years is 204 which is 9.88% of total population of Bains, and child sex ratio is approximately 821 as compared to Punjab state average of 846.

As per the report published by Census India in 2011, 637 people were engaged in work activities out of the total population of Bains which includes 566 males and 71 females. According to census survey report 2011, 58.40% workers describe their work as main work and 41.60% workers are involved in Marginal activity providing livelihood for less than 6 months.

Education 
The village has a Punjabi medium, co-ed upper primary school founded in 1975. The schools provide mid-day meal as per Indian Midday Meal Scheme. The school provide free education to children between the ages of 6 and 14 as per Right of Children to Free and Compulsory Education Act.

Amardeep Singh Shergill Memorial college Mukandpur and Sikh National College Banga are the nearest colleges.

Landmarks 
Baliyana Mandir, Maheshiyana Mandir and Baba Mangal Das Mandir are religious sites in the village.

Transport 

See also 
List of villages in India

References

External links 
 Tourism of Punjab 
 Census of Punjab
 Locality Based PINCode

Villages in Shaheed Bhagat Singh Nagar district